The Três Barras River is a river of Paraná state in southeastern Brazil. It is a tributary of the Das Antas River.

See also
List of rivers of Paraná

References

Rivers of Paraná (state)